Polycarp Pereira (born 26 January 1932) is a Ugandan field hockey player. He competed in the men's tournament at the 1972 Summer Olympics.

References

External links
 

1932 births
Living people
Ugandan male field hockey players
Olympic field hockey players of Uganda
Field hockey players at the 1972 Summer Olympics
Place of birth missing (living people)
Ugandan people of Indian descent
Ugandan people of Goan descent